George Harrison (1943–2001) was an English musician and the lead guitarist of The Beatles.

George Harrison may also refer to:

Arts and entertainment
 George Henry Harrison (1816–1846), English watercolour painter
 George Harrison Marks (1926–1997), English photographer and director
 George Harrison (album), a 1979 album by George Harrison

Business
 George L. Harrison (1887–1958), American banker
 G. Charter Harrison (1881–1959), Anglo-American management consultant and cost account pioneer
 George Harrison (executive) (fl. c. 2000), American business manager
 George McGregor Harrison, 1895-1968, American labor leader

Politics
 George Harrison (Bossiney MP), Member of Parliament (MP) for Bossiney
 George Harrison (civil servant) (1767–1841), British jurist & government administrator
 George Harrison (Hertford MP) (1680–1759), British MP for Hertford, 1727–1734 and 1741–1759
 George Harrison (Irish republican) (1915–2004), arms trafficker for the Provisional Irish Republican Army
 George Harrison (Lord Provost) (1811–1885), Lord Provost of Edinburgh, philanthropist and briefly Member of Parliament for Edinburgh South
 George Moffett Harrison (1847–1923), American politician and judge in Virginia
 George Paul Harrison Jr. (1841–1922), American politician, U.S. Representative from Alabama, Confederate States Army colonel
 George Paul Harrison Sr. (1813–1888), American politician, Georgia House of Representatives, Georgia (Confederate) militia general
 George W. Harrison, journalist, newspaper editor and publisher, and North Dakota politician

Sports
 George Harrison (cricketer, born 1860) (1860–1900), English cricketer
 George Harrison (Yorkshire cricketer) (1862–1940), English cricketer
 George Harrison (Glamorgan cricketer) (1895–1???), English cricketer
 George Harrison (footballer, born 1892) (1892–1939), professional footballer for Everton, and England international
 George Harrison (footballer, born 1900) (1900–1969), English footballer for Durham City, Darlington, Carlisle United
 George Harrison (swimmer) (1939–2011), American swimmer

Other
 George H. Harrison (1841–1919), American sailor and Medal of Honor recipient
 George R. Harrison (1898–1979), American physicist
 George Harrison (prospector), Australian discoverer of gold in the Transvaal, which led to the Witwatersrand Gold Rush of 1886

See also
 Harrison George, American activist